Mohini is a 2014 Indian Tamil-language soap opera that aired on Kalaignar TV from 22 September 2014 to 30 October 2015 on Monday through Thursday at 19:30 (IST) and later extended up to Friday and A new show named Ramanujar replaced this show at 19:30 (IST) and pushed this serial to 20:00 (IST) instead since 1 June 2015. The show last aired on 30 October 2015 and ended with 276 episodes.

The show starring by Sivaranjani, Raja and Ferozkhan. The show is produced by AVM Productions, Story Screenplay and Dialogue by S.Sekkizhar and directed by Raama Krishnan. The show replace Vairakiyam and Bhavani.

Plot
The storyline of "Mohini" (Sivaranjani) named after the protagonist Mohini will revolve around the loving and caring girl who ditches her love for the sake of her parents and marries the guy the friend of her ex-boyfriend (Ferozkhan). The twist starts from the first night of their life.

Cast

Main
 Sivaranjani as Mohini/(deceased Jagan) Gautham's Wife and Jagan EX-Girlfriend
 Raja as gautham (Mohini`s Husband)
 Ferozkhan as Jagan (Mohini`s EX-Boyfriend) (Dead)

Supporting
 Gayathri
 Ashwanth Thilak
 Poorni as Geetha
 Flim Shiva
 Sripriya
 Sanjeykumar
 Sujatha
 Sarath
 Yamunaa
 Egavalli
 Divya

Title song
It was written by lyricist Vairamuthu, composed Ramani Bharadwaj sung by S. P. Balasubrahmanyam.

Soundtrack

Awards

References

External links
 

Kalaignar TV television series
Tamil-language fantasy television series
2014 Tamil-language television series debuts
2010s Tamil-language television series
2015 Tamil-language television series endings
Tamil-language television shows